Hanns Dieter Hüsch (6 May 1925, in Moers – 6 December 2005, in Windeck-Werfen) was a German author, cabaret artist, actor, songwriter and radio commentator.

With a working life of more than 53 years on the German cabaret stage and 70 of his own programmes he was one of the most productive and successful representatives of literary cabaret in Germany in the 20th century.

Life and work
Hüsch grew up in the Niederrhein-Area near the Netherlands and had to suffer of 'pes adductus' until he was 11 years old. Because he could not play with other children, he became a loner and began to write. When he was 22, Hüsch began to study in Mainz, "but I did not study, I wrote cabaret pieces". In 1949 Hüsch married Marianne and they had a daughter named Anna. At the time, they did not earn enough money to feed the young family, and Hüsch moved to Stuttgart, where he obtained employment at the local radio station. He worked under the direction of Guy Walter as author, songwriter and radio commentator. In 1955 Hanns Dieter Hüsch started his first cabaret ensemble, 'Arche nova', which became famous in southern Germany and Switzerland.

From 1965 on, Hüsch released phonograph records with literary cabaret pieces, chansons and poems – he sold more than 50 albums until his death. In 1967 he joined the left-wing German student movement and performed in Berlin on Burg Waldeck. But some elements of the student movement did not like Hüsch's non-violent attitude. They heckled his performances from June 1968 until August 1969 and "it was just as if your comrades told you that you are not good enough for the fight and that you have to give it up", said Hüsch. He was disappointed and hurt by their actions against his art, decided not to perform in Germany for years, and moved to Switzerland.

In 1972 he returned to German cabaret stages and subsequently became one of the most productive and successful representatives of literary cabaret in Germany, with more than 200 performances every year. In 1985 his wife died, and Hüsch wrote his most successful programme ever: "Und sie bewegt mich doch"/"And yet she moves me". In 1988 Hüsch left Mainz and went to Cologne, where he met his second wife Christiane. In 1996 Hüsch contracted lung cancer, caused by his cigarette smoking, but survived. Until the end of 2000, he toured with his farewell programme "Wir sehen uns wieder" ("We will meet again") in Germany, Austria and Switzerland. In 2001, a stroke ended his plan to play King Lear at the Staatstheater Dresden. Complications resulting from the stroke and cancer confined him to his home in Windeck near Cologne, where he was nursed by Christiane. Hanns Dieter Hüsch died 6 months after his 80th birthday.

It is said that more than 3.5 million people have seen Hanns Dieter Hüsch's live performances from 1947 to 2000. He received the Bundesverdienstkreuz and, twice, the German Cabaret award "Deutscher Kleinkunstpreis"; he also received honorary citizenship of Moers and Mainz, the North Rhine-Westphalia culture prize, the 1995 Kassel Literary Prize, and the culture prize of Rhineland-Palatinate, as well as other honors.

References
(in German):
 Wilhelm Brunswick, Jürgen Schmude (eds): Untersteht euch – es wird nichts gemacht. Brendow, Moers 2005.
 Jürgen Kessler (ed.): Hanns Dieter Hüsch – Kabarett auf eigene Faust: 50 Bühnenjahre. Goldmann, München 2000 (updated paperback edition of the hardcover published by Blessing in 1997) 316 S, 
 Georg Bungter (ed.): Auf der Suche nach dem Gemüt: Hanns Dieter Hüsch im Garten auffe Bank. KIWI, Köln 2002, 
 Martin Buchholz: Was machen wir hinterher? Hanns Dieter Hüsch – Bekenntnisse eines Kabarettisten. Brendow, Moers 2000,

External links

 

 Hanns Dieter Hüsch portrait at kabarettlive.de
 Official Internetpage on Hanns Dieter Hüsch
 International Essen Songdays 1968 about Hüsch
 Hommage zum 80. Geburtstag, SWR, broadcast of 30 April 2005
Articles:
 Hüsch nimmt Abschied in Moers, WDR, 17 December 2000 with videoclip
 Sach ma nix!, NRZ, 4 May 2005, Hüsch explains the Lower Rhine
 "Verabredung mit dem 'lieben Gott'", WDR, 6 December 2005, obituary
 "Der große Zuschauer", Tagesspiegel, 7 December 2005"Aufgeklärter Kleinbürger, Priester unter der Narrenkappe – Hanns Dieter Hüsch, Altmeister des literarischen Kabaretts, ist tot"
 "Ein Himmelsorganist: Zum Tod von Hanns Dieter Hüsch", FAZ, 7 December 2005 – with picture gallery and a critique of Hüsch's critics

1925 births
2005 deaths
People from Wesel (district)
Cabaret
German male stage actors
German male comedians
Commanders Crosses of the Order of Merit of the Federal Republic of Germany
Recipients of the Saarland Order of Merit
Members of the Order of Merit of North Rhine-Westphalia
German male writers
20th-century comedians
Saarländischer Rundfunk people